The Illinois Express coached by Dave Robisch was a professional basketball franchise based in Springfield, Illinois from 1989-1990. The team played its inaugural seasons in the World Basketball League before folding. 

The Express played its home games at the Prairie Capital Convention Center.

References

World Basketball League teams
Sports teams in Springfield, Illinois
Sports clubs disestablished in 1990
Basketball teams established in 1989
1989 establishments in Illinois
1990 disestablishments in Illinois